Kate Veale (born 5 January 1994) is an Irish racewalker who competes in international level events. She was 2011 World Youth champion in the 5 kilometre race walk. She has multiple irish titles. She won a bronze medal at the European cup junior 10 km. She competed in world university Games in 2019. She has also represented Ireland at the 2010 Summer Youth Olympics and finished fourth in the 5 kilometre race walk.

References

1994 births
Living people
Sportspeople from County Waterford
Irish female racewalkers
Athletes (track and field) at the 2010 Summer Youth Olympics